Basavaraja Devaru is an Indian guru, the head of the Dharwad based Mansur Sri Revana Siddeshwara Mutt. The Mutt follows Shaivism based on the teachings of Revana Siddheshwara a Veerashaiva saint from North Karnataka, India.

References

Indian Shaivite religious leaders
21st-century Hindu religious leaders
People from Dharwad
Living people
Year of birth missing (living people)